Christophe Boutin (born 28 October 1959) is a French political scientist. Doctor of political sciences and public law, he is a professor at the University of Caen,  after having been on the staff of the University of Burgundy.

Publications 

 Politique et tradition. Julius Evola dans le siècle (1898–1974), Paris, Éditions Kimé, 1992.
 With Frédéric Rouvillois, Quinquennat ou septennat ?, Paris, Flammarion, 2000.
 (ed.) with Frédéric Rouvillois, L'abstention électorale, apaisement ou épuisement, lecture, 29–30 November 2001, Organised by CENTRE (Centre d'études normand sur la théorie et la régulation de l'État), Paris, F.-X. de Guibert, 2002.
 (ed) with Frédéric Rouvillois, Décentraliser en France. Idéologies, histoire et prospective, CENTRE lecture, 28 and 29 November 2002, Caen, Paris, F.-X. de Guibert, 2003.
 (ed.) with Frédéric Rouvillois, Partis politiques et démocratie. Inséparables mais incompatibles, CENTRE lecture, November 2004, Caen, Paris, F.-X. de Guibert, 2005.
 Gens de mer au travail, work coordinated by Christophe Boutin, Jean-Louis Lenhof, Élisabeth Ridel, published by Pôle Maritime, introduction by André Zysberg, Caen, Maison de la recherche en sciences humaines de Caen, 2007.

References

1959 births
Living people
French political scientists
French male non-fiction writers
Academic staff of the University of Caen Normandy